= Haravanahalli =

Village in Karnataka, India

Coordinates: 13°07′N 76°07′E

Haravanahalli is a village in the southern state of Karnataka, India.

== See also ==
- Bellary
- Districts of Karnataka
